Virgibacillus arcticus is a moderately halophilic, endospore-forming bacterium originally isolated from permafrost in the Canadian high Arctic. Its type strain is Hal1T (=DSM 19574T =JCM 14839T).

References

Further reading
Da Silva, Neusely, et al. Microbiological Examination Methods of Food and Water: A Laboratory Manual. CRC Press, 2012.
Staley, James T., et al. "Bergey's manual of systematic bacteriology, vol. 3."Williams and Wilkins, Baltimore, MD (1989): 2250–2251.

External links

LPSN
Type strain of Virgibacillus arcticus at BacDive -  the Bacterial Diversity Metadatabase

Bacillaceae
Bacteria described in 2009